The 1999 Chrono des Herbiers was the 18th edition of the Chrono des Nations cycle race and was held on 17 October 1999. The race started and finished in Les Herbiers. The race was won by Serhiy Honchar.

General classification

References

1999
1999 in road cycling
1999 in French sport
October 1999 sports events in Europe